The 1984 James Hardie 1000 was the 25th running of the Bathurst 1000 touring car race. It was held on 30 September 1984 at the Mount Panorama Circuit just outside Bathurst in New South Wales, Australia and was Round 4 of the 1984 Australian Endurance Championship. This race was celebrated as 'The Last of the Big Bangers', in reference to the Group C touring cars, which were competing at Bathurst for the last time.

The race was won by Peter Brock and Larry Perkins driving a Holden VK Commodore for the Holden Dealer Team, the third consecutive victory for Brock, Perkins and the HDT. It was the most dominant team performance for the HDT in the history of the race as the team claimed a 1-2 finish with John Harvey and David Parsons backing up their team leaders by finishing second. Third place was taken by the Mazda RX-7 of Allan Moffat and Gregg Hansford. Moffat privately disputed the Harvey/Parsons Commodore finishing second as it had spent almost 3 laps in the pits mid-race with a gearbox problem, but saw little value in protesting as it would not win him the race so decided to settle for third.

The race also saw the first appearance of the international Group A cars at Bathurst (the category had made its Australian debut in the Castrol 500 at Sandown 3 weeks earlier). The Group A class was won by the TWR Mobil Rover Vitesse V8 of race rookies Jeff Allam from England and Armin Hahne from West Germany who finished 12th outright. Second in class and 15th outright was the JPS Team BMW 635 CSi of  Formula One World Champion Denny Hulme and Bavarian Prince Leopold von Bayern. Third in Group A and 20th outright was the Barry Seton / Don Smith V8 Ford Mustang. For Seton, who had won the race outright in 1965, it would be his final start at Bathurst as he quietly retired from race driving at the end of 1984. Dick Johnson Racing, who started 4th on the grid with their Group C Ford XE Falcon, also entered a Mustang in the Group A category and although 1984 Australian Touring Car Champion Dick Johnson qualified the underpowered car in 48th, it was only there as insurance should there be a repeat of 1983 where he destroyed his Falcon in a famous Hardies Heroes crash and the Mustang, which Johnson had purchased from the German Zakspeed team, was officially withdrawn the day before the race.

Class structure

Group C
This was the last Bathurst 1000 to include Group C Touring Cars, which had first contested the Bathurst 1000 in 1973. While a production based category, continual parity adjustments to keep the leading vehicles roughly at the same pace had seen the cars become wildly over-specified. That led to a decision by the Confederation of Australian Motor Sport (CAMS) in mid-1983 that Australian touring car racing would abandon its locally developed Group C rules and would be run under regulations based on the FIA's international Group A rules from 1 January 1985.

The major contenders in Group C were the V8-engined Ford Falcons and Holden Commodores, the lone V12 Jaguar XJ-S and 6 cylinder BMW 635 CSi, the rotary Mazda RX-7's, and the Nissan Bluebird turbos. Also running in Group C were the now outdated Chevrolet Camaro Z28s.

It would be the final Bathurst appearance for the Bluebird turbo which would be replaced in Group A in 1986 by the Nissan Skyline DR30 RS. After the car made its debut in the inaugural 500-mile race at Phillip Island in 1960, it would be the final Bathurst 1000 for the Ford Falcon until 1992. The Commodore (in various models), Jaguar, BMW and Mazda all saw action during the Group A years in Australia (1985–1992).

Group A
The international Group A formula was allowed to enter for the first time as a prelude to their adoption for Bathurst and the Australian Touring Car Championship in 1985. The Group A cars were closer to pure bred racing cars in concept (notably the allowing of the cars interior to be removed, as well as the cars having a lower ride height), but without the extensive performance modifications allowed for Group C. Without the performance upgrades, aerodynamic aids and larger tyres of the Group C cars, the Group A cars were much slower (the lead 3.5L V8 Rover Vitesse of Jeff Allam and Armin Hahne qualified 10 seconds slower than the pole time set by George Fury in the Nissan Bluebird turbo), and thus formed their own class. The Rover's main Group A challenger would be the BMW 635 CSi run by JPS Team BMW.

The other contenders in the Group A class included the Ford Mustang, Ford Capri Mk.III, Alfa Romeo GTV6, Toyota Sprinter AE86, Mitsubishi Starion, Audi 5+5, and Toyota Celica Supra.

Hardies Heroes
Conditions on Mount Panorama were bitterly cold for the 1984 edition of Hardies Heroes with snow having fallen at the top of the circuit early in the morning. This saw a number of cars, notably the lighter Mazda RX-7's struggle to get sufficient heat into their tyres.

* Nissan scored the first ever Bathurst 1000 Pole Position by a car fitted with a turbocharger when George Fury recorded a time of 2:13.85 in his Nissan Bluebird Turbo. Fury's time in the runoff would not be beaten until 1991, ironically by another Nissan, the R32 GT-R. As it was the last year of Group C, Fury's time remains the fastest ever at Mt Panorama by a Group C touring car. Early morning snow on the mountain and the cold conditions were thought to favour the turbo over the V8 powered cars. Almost 20 years later Fred Gibson, who was by 1986 the Nissan team manager, confirmed that the Bluebirds had a turbo boost adjuster on the dashboard, used to tune boost pressure once track conditions were better understood in order to preserve the turbocharger. * It was the first time in the seven-year history of Hardies Heroes that a V8 powered car did not claim Pole Position at Bathurst, and the first time since qualifying first counted for grid positions in 1967 that a V8 had not been on pole. It would be the start of a run of 8 pole positions in 9 years for turbo powered cars at Bathurst and a V8 powered car would not sit on pole again at Bathurst until 1993.* The 1984 Hardies Heroes holds the Top 10 shootout record for the most number of marques competing with six with (in order) Nissan, Holden, Ford, Mazda, BMW and Jaguar represented. The record was equaled in both Super Touring races in 1997 and 1998. * Jaguar became the 7th marque to represent in Hardies Heroes, making the first of only two appearances in the top ten runoff with Bathurst rookie driver Tom Walkinshaw (a Bathurst rookie despite having already won the 1984 European Touring Car Championship) qualifying John Goss' V12 Jaguar XJ-S in 10th place. Not surprisingly the factory backed Peter Stuyvesant RX-7 of Allan Moffat was the quickest of the trio ending up 5th on the grid.

Official results

Notes
 Cars 12, 34 & 77 were involved in a start line accident when the #12 Jaguar XJ-S had clutch failure at the start. This caused the race to be stopped and for the first time in the races history there was a complete restart. All three cars failed to take the restart.
 Car 18 was involved in a separate accident during the first lap of the initial race being shunted off the track and into a fence on Conrod Straight by another car not heeding the red flags and was also unable to front for the second start.
 Cars 2 & 43 were also involved in a separate incident at the start with both cars bouncing off each other and the #43 also bouncing off the pit wall. #43 was out with engine failure after 15 laps, while #2 crashed at Forrest's Elbow one lap later.
 Car 7 was a Holden VK Commodore which used Group C running gear including the engine and gearbox, but unlike the VK's from the Holden Dealer Team, Roadways Racing and K-Mart Racing, car 7 used the VK's Group A body which did not include the aerodynamic front and rear spoilers or the flared tyre guards.

Statistics
 Provisional Pole Position - #05 Peter Brock - 2:14.31
 Pole Position - #15 George Fury - 2:13.850 (record)
 Fastest Group A qualifier - #61 Jeff Allam - 2:23.41
 Fastest Lap (Group C) - #05 Peter Brock - 2:15.13 (lap record)
 Fastest Lap (Group A) - #60 - Steve Soper 2:24.87 (class lap record)
 Winners average speed - 157.5 km/h (record)
 Race Time - 6:23:13.06 (record)
 Number of Entrants - 64 (record)

References

External links
 James Hardie 1000 Bathurst 1984 (race results), www.touringcarracing.net
 James Hardie 1000 - Mount Panorama, Bathurst - 30th September, 1984 (race results & Official Programme), www.uniquecarsandparts.com.au
 Bathurst 1984 (images), www.autopics.com.au

Motorsport in Bathurst, New South Wales
James Hardie 1000